was the pen-name of novelist, science fiction, and mystery writer in Shōwa period Japan. His father, Sōda Kiichirō (左右田喜一郎), was an economist and a banker.

Kuronuma was the writer of the Kaiju classic Giant Monster of the Sky: Rodan (known in Japan as ), a 1956 tokusatsu film produced by Tōhō Studios. The film followed in the footsteps of Godzilla and was also popular in the United States.

He followed on the success of Rodan with Varan the Unbelievable in 1958. It proved to be one of the least popular of the Tōhō movies of all time, and nearly destroyed his career.

Kuronuma turned his attention to television drama, writing scripts for one of Japan's first science fiction series, which ran for 26 episodes: from 3 January 1960 to 28 June 1960. In addition to writing for the series, he also helped to compose the music.

See also 
 List of Japanese authors

References
Bush, Lawrence C. Asian Horror Encyclopedia: Asian Horror Culture in Literature, Manga, and Folklore. Writers Club Press (2001)

External links

1902 births
1985 deaths
Japanese science fiction writers
20th-century Japanese screenwriters